West Hyde is a village situated alongside the A412 road, in the Three Rivers District in south-west Hertfordshire, England. At the 2011 the population of the village was included in the Three Rivers ward of Maple Cross and Mill End.

Notable buildings 
 Jolly Gardeners - Believed to have been built in 1820, Ye Jolly Gardeners was the local public house for the village of West Hyde until 1956 and then converted into a house.
 The Oaks - Originally named The Royal Oak, and then The Fisherman's Tackle (from 1990), The Oaks (from 2013) is the village's current public house. 
 St Thomas - The church of St Thomas of Canterbury was built in 1845. It was built in the Norman style and designed by Thomas Smith, Architect of Hertford; a copy of his earlier Holy Trinity Church at Wareside, completed in 1841.  Pulhamite artificial stonework mouldings were used throughout. The building was faced with extremely high quality knapped flintwork, at a cost of £2,200.

References

Villages in Hertfordshire